Christ Church, also known as Christ Episcopal Church, is a Christian house of worship located on the corner of Church Street and Main Street (U.S. Route 206) in Newton, New Jersey.  It is a parish overseen by the Episcopal Diocese of Newark, a diocese of the Episcopal Church in the United States of America. The congregation first met on 28 December 1769 and was granted a charter by New Jersey's last Royal Governor William Franklin on behalf of Britain's King George III. Christ Church is the oldest church in Newton and the third oldest parish in the Diocese of Newark.

The current church building, erected in 1868–1869, is the second structure built at the site, and is an example of the Broken Ashlar or Rustic mode of Gothic Revival architecture patterned after medieval English parish churches. The interior nave features several stained-glass windows depicting scenes from the life of Jesus of Nazareth fabricated by J&R Lamb Studios. On 24 September 1992, Christ Church, Newton was included on the New Jersey Register of Historic Places as part of the Newton Town Plot Historic District which was approved and entered on the National Register of Historic Places on 12 November 1992.

History

Establishment

In a 1770 letter, the Rev'd Dr Thomas B. Chandler, rector of St John's Church in the provincial capital Elizabethtown (now Elizabeth), reported that he had visited Sussex County in the northwestern part of the province of New Jersey in November 1769 and found that there were 50 families belonging to the Church of England in the region. Chandler reported that "they frequently assemble in private houses and read the Liturgy" and that an Anglican clergyman "had never been in those parts before." Many of these families met at Newton, the county seat of Sussex County, on 28 December 1769, to establish an Anglican parish.

On 15 August 1774, Christ Church was formally incorporated as The Rector, Church Wardens, and Vestrymen of Christ's Church at New Town, in the county of Sussex and province of New Jersey. The colony's last royal governor, William Franklin, granted and signed a charter on behalf of Britain's King George III. The congregation petitioned the East Jersey Board of Proprietors, a colonial land agency, asking for their assistance to establish a church. Jonathan Hampton (1716–1777), a landowner, coachmaker, and merchant from Elizabethtown, deeded lands from his surveyed town plot to the congregation on 14 December 1774 "for the encouragement of the Episcopal religion...and toward the maintenance & support of a parson officiating in said church".

Early history (1769–1869)

The congregation called for a clergyman, and the Rev'd Uzal Ogden, Jr. (1744–1822) was sent as a missionary lay reader and catechist in 1770 to the area on behalf of the Society for the Propagation of the Gospel. He would become rector in 1773 after his ordination. According to local historian Kevin Wright, the parsonage was built circa 1770 by local land agent John Pettit. Services were held in the County Court House (built 1762–1765), which he described in 1771 as "very commodious and serves us to perform Divine Service in". During the Revolution, Ogden supported the cause of American independence, and according to tradition quartered sheep in the parsonage basement for the use of the Continental Army. Ogden left Christ Church in 1784 to become an assistant at Trinity Church in New York City, and later served as rector of Trinity Church, Newark, where his father served as warden.

Although Ogden was listed as Christ Church's rector until as late as 1792 and preached infrequently in the area, the rectorate in Newton remained without a clergyman until the appointment of the Rev'd Clarkson Dunn in 1820. During the 36 years, services were held irregularly, at the court house; this was an era described as "a long period of discouragement, almost of dissolution." The congregation reported only six communicants during this time. Dunn would operate a school at the rectory beginning in December 1823. Assisted by William Rankin, an English teacher, Dunn taught classics. Dunn remained in this charge until 1857 when his son-in-law, the Rev'd Nathaniel Pettit, assumed the pulpit.

The congregation's first church building was erected beginning in May 1823 and consecrated a few months later on 19 November 1823 by the Rt Rev'd John Croes, Bishop of New Jersey. This building was located at the corner of Church and Main streets, on a tract of land conveyed to the congregation by William T. Anderson, a local attorney. The Gothic structure was described as small; it accommodated 250 worshipers. Toward the end of Pettit's tenure, the congregation was compelled to build a new church building as their current building had become unstable and unsafe. During the construction, the congregation met at the county courthouse and at Rinker's Hall, a building located near the courthouse on the Newton Town Green.

Current church (1869–present)

According to Snell, during the forty-five-year tenures of Dunn and Pettit as rectors, "parochial statistics from 1820 to 1867 show an aggregate of 510 baptisms, 241 confirmations, 334 marriages, and 468 funerals". The growth in membership necessitated a new, larger edifice. To fund the construction of a new church building, the congregation sought the permission of the state legislature to sell the lands granted to it by warrant. Permission was given in 1867. The congregation sold this property on 10 May 1868 for $15,579.  The congregation also sold its parsonage and accompanying lands for $17,600 to prominent lawyer, Levi Shepherd in October. A loan to support the construction was provided by Robert Hamilton (1809–1878), a vestryman and warden and generous financial contributor to the parish. Hamilton was a prominent political figure, serving in the New Jersey General Assembly in 1863 and 1864, the latter year as Speaker, and from 1873 to 1877, he represented the New Jersey's 4th congressional district (covering northwestern New Jersey) in the United States House of Representatives. In 1879, a year after Hamilton's death, his widow Sarah forgave the loan, which left the church debt free after the construction.

Local historian Frank Greenagel writes that "the Episcopal church formalized its adherence to the English Gothic style in the late 1840s under the influence of a powerful bishop, George Washington Doane", and that the parish at Newton among many in the state adhere to that style. The vestry and diocese contracted "for the building of a new church...for $23,000" on the site of the old church building by contractor Isaac L. Overton of Newark, New Jersey from a design by architect Jonathan V. Nichols. The first service was held on 11 July 1869, and the building was consecrated by the Bishop of New Jersey, the Rt Rev'd, William Henry Odenheimer (1817–1879) on 20 October 1869. Today the structure boasts a three-story bell tower, but previously the tower was topped by a 108-foot high spire surmounted by a 12-foot high cross. This spire was removed after being struck by lightning on three occasions.

A rectory, built in 1868–1869, was used for that purpose for thirty years before being renovated for activity space for church organizations and fellowship. In October 1901, the Vestry of Christ Church authorised purchase of a new rectory located on Liberty Street. Holley Hall, the central facility for parish activities, was constructed with a 1965 bequest from the estate of Alice Herbert Holley, daughter-in-law of the Rev'd William Welles Holley, fourth rector, who was the first to reside in the former rectory after its completion in 1869.

Architecture, furnishings and fittings

On 24 September 1992, Christ Church, Newton was placed on the New Jersey Register of Historic Places as part of the Newton Town Plot Historic District which was approved and entered on the National Register of Historic Places on 12 November 1992. The  historic district comprises 56 contributing structures which were built on Jonathan Hampton's surveyed town plot for the town of Newton (then Sussex Court House).

Designed by architect Jonathan V. Nichols, the current church building was erected 1868–1869 and is an example of the Broken Ashlar or Rustic mode of Gothic Revival architecture. It was designed in a "simple basilican style of nave flanked by shed aisles (no clerestory)", that was "patterned upon medieval English parish churches". The cornerstone was laid on 21 August 1868 and the building was constructed of native blue limestone, with trimmings in Newark sandstone, with a roof of patterned or traceried black slate that was quarried in Newton.

Christ Church's contribution to the historic district includes the church building and a Gothic Revival style rectory, built in 1868. The site also includes an eighteenth-century Federal-style townhouse that was the home of Colonel Thomas Anderson (c.1743–1805), deputy assistant quartermaster general of the Continental Army during the American Revolution, one of the parish's original vestrymen (elected in 1769) and warden of Christ Church from 1784 to 1794. A Newton attorney with statewide prominence, Anderson was the first Surrogate of Sussex County (appointed in 1768) and also served as County Clerk from 1770 to 1777. His home, built about 1785, was originally located on Park Place one-half block to the north of the church property and faced Newton's town green before being relocated adjacent to the church property at 62 Main Street in 1896. In 1965, it was purchased by Christ Church and serves as the parish office. The Anderson House in 1958 was marked with an historical plaque by the Society of Daughters of Colonial Wars in New Jersey.

When completed in 1869, the church's interior could accommodate 400 parishioners, and featured a tint-glass chancel window by Fredericks of Brooklyn. Today, the interior is adorned with a Tiffany-style window above the altar, dedicated in 1919, and several pictorial stained-glass windows (dedicated in 1968) around the nave featuring scenes associated with the life of Jesus of Nazareth. The nave windows are the works of the United States' oldest continuously run decorative arts firm, J & R. Lamb Studios, and include work designed by stained-glass artist Heinrich Jan Van de Burgh. They including depictions of:

 The Annunciation,
 The Nativity of Jesus,
 The Holy Family's flight into Egypt,
 Christ as a boy in the Temple,
 The Baptism of Jesus,
 The Temptation of Christ in the desert,
 The calling of the disciples

 The marriage at Cana
 Christ's blessing of the Children
 The Entry into Jerusalem on Palm Sunday
 The Last Supper
 Jesus in prayer in the Garden of Gethsemane
 Various parables from the Gospels,
 Scenes of Christ's crucifixion, resurrection, and ascension.

Rectors

Eighteen clergymen have served as rector of Christ Church, Newton. The first, Uzal Ogden, Jr., was the son of Newark merchant and churchwarden. Ogden began to serve in northwestern New Jersey in 1770 and, in addition to Newton, covered an area of 2,000 square miles including St James Episcopal Church in Knowlton Township, New Jersey (founded in 1769). Because of the lack of a bishop in Britain's North American colonies, Ogden traveled to England to be ordained by the Rt Rev'd Richard Terrick, the Bishop of London, who had jurisdiction over all parishes of the Church of England in North America. After his departure in 1784, the pulpit remained unfilled until 1823. During this time, several clergymen, including the Reverend John Croes (1762–1832), later the first Bishop of New Jersey, officiated on occasion.

The second rector, Clarkson Dunn, served both the Newton congregation and St James in Knowlton. Dunn, who died in 1870, was honored by the town of Newton with the naming of two streets, Clarkson Street and Dunn Place, which frame the property of the parish's old parsonage. After a ten-year tenure, Dunn's son-in-law, Nathaniel Pettit, resigned in 1867 to become Sussex County's first Superintendent of Schools. Moffett, who served as rector for fifteen years, resigned from the pulpit to accept an appointment from President Grover Cleveland to become the American minister (essentially ambassador) to Greece in 1885.

The current rector, Robert T. Griner, received a bachelor's degree in Psychology from Drew University and studied at the University of Oxford before completing a Master of Divinity degree at Yale University.

See also
 First Presbyterian Church (Newton, New Jersey)
 National Register of Historic Places listings in Sussex County, New Jersey
 Newton Cemetery (Newton, New Jersey)
 Episcopal Diocese of Newark

References

Notes

Citations

Further reading
 Charles L. Steele, A History of Christ Church, New Jersey (Newton, NJ: Henry C. Kelsey, 1910; reprinted 1984).

External links
 
 Christ Church, Newton (official website)
 The Episcopal Diocese of Newark

Newton, New Jersey
1760s establishments in New Jersey
Episcopal Diocese of Newark
History of Sussex County, New Jersey
National Register of Historic Places in Sussex County, New Jersey
Churches in Sussex County, New Jersey
Episcopal church buildings in New Jersey
Churches completed in 1869
Gothic Revival architecture in New Jersey
Churches on the National Register of Historic Places in New Jersey